EMDS may refer to:
 Ecosystem Management Decision Support, an application framework
 Electromagnetic Design System, electronic design software

See also 
 EMD (disambiguation)